Line 8 of the Shenzhen Metro (also known as the Yantian line) is an East-West line from Liantang to . It opened on 28 October 2020. Line 8 is the first line to serve Yantian District. Line 8 merges into Line 2 at Liantang station, with trains on Line 8 continuing service to Chiwan station.

Timeline

Service routes
  — 
  —  (Working days peak hours only)

Stations

Phase 2 & Phase 3
 Phase 2 and Phase 3 both under construction. Phase 2 from Yantian Road to Xiaomeisha, opening in 2024. Phase 3 from Xiaomeisha to Xichong, opening in 2025.

Rolling Stock

Notes

References

Shenzhen Metro lines
Transport infrastructure under construction in China